Leroy Earle "Andy" Anderson (April 5, 1924 – May 11, 1993) was an American football player and coach. He served as the head football coach at Lakeland College—known now as Lakeland University—in Plymouth, Wisconsin from 1964 to 1966, compiling a record of 9–16.

Anderson played college football at the University of Texas under head coach Dana X. Bible, where he teamed with quarterback Bobby Layne.

Head coaching record

College

References

1924 births
1993 deaths
American football ends
Lakeland Muskies football coaches
Texas Longhorns football players
High school football coaches in Wisconsin
People from Kenosha, Wisconsin
Players of American football from Wisconsin